Dropping a Han Dynasty Urn is a photographic artwork created by Ai Weiwei in 1995. Composed of three 148 by 121 cm black-and-white photographs, it documents Ai holding, dropping, and standing over the remains of a Han dynasty urn that was approximately 2,000 years old. Ai broke two urns worth a few thousand dollars to complete this series of photographs, as the first group of photographs failed to capture the process.

Process 
The urn used in Ai Weiwei's work was one of a group of Han urns that Ai acquired in the 1990s. This was Ai's second work using these urns. The first was Han Jar Overpainted with Coca-Cola Logo, created in 1994. During the process of Dropping a Han Dynasty Urn, Ai chose another urn to re-photograph because the first shot failed to capture the descent of the urn.

Related works 
In 2006, Ai selected 51 of the Han urns he had acquired to create Colored Vases, which was exhibited at the Hirshhorn Museum and Sculpture Garden in conjunction with Dropping a Han Dynasty Urn. The work was recreated in Lego bricks in 2015.

See also 
Fragments of History, from 2012, is a work by Manuel Salvisberg that imitates or parodies Dropping a Han Dynasty Urn. Three black-and-white photographs show Swiss art collector Uli Sigg dropping a replica of one of the vases from Ai's Han Jar Overpainted with Coca-Cola Logo series. Sigg, who is a friend of Ai, described the photos as "something to shock Ai Weiwei".

In 2014, one Miami artist imitated Dropping a Han Dynasty Urn, destroying one of Ai's vases from the Colored Vases series at the Pérez Art Museum exhibition.

References

1995 works